Leon Kieres (born 26 May 1948) is a Polish lawyer and politician. He was the president of the Instytut Pamięci Narodowej (Institute of National Remembrance) (8 June 2000 – 22 December 2005), a judge of the Polish Constitutional Tribunal.

Biography
Leon Kieres was born on 26 May 1948 in Zielona, Poland. He graduated from the University of Wrocław, the Department of Law. Since 1971 he has been working as an academic teacher at the Department of Law and Administration at the University of Wrocław. In 1976 he defended his doctoral thesis, while in 1985 he successfully completed the habilitation process. In 1991 he was awarded a professorship. Since 1996 he holds the title of professor appointed by the President of the Republic of Poland.

In the 2006 local election he stood for Lower Silesian Regional Assembly. He polled 26,490 votes in 2 district, as a candidate on the Civic Platform list, and was elected. The other councillors elected him as chairperson of the assembly. When he was elected to the Senate of the Republic of Poland he had to resign; his seat was taken by Jacek Pilawa, and Jerzy Pokój was elected as the new chairperson.

On 21 October 2007 in the parliamentary election he was elected to the Senate of the Republic of Poland. He polled 259,453 votes in 3 Wrocław district, as a candidate on the Civic Platform list. He has been a member of Senate VII Term since 5 November 2007.

References 
 Profile at Nauka Polska portal

1948 births
Living people
People from Białystok County
Freedom Union (Poland) politicians
Civic Platform politicians
Members of the Senate of Poland 1997–2001
Lawyers from Wrocław
Academic staff of the University of Wrocław
University of Wrocław alumni
People associated with the Institute of National Remembrance
Knights of the Order of Polonia Restituta